Negera disspinosa is a moth in the family Drepanidae. It was described by Watson in 1965. It is found in Gabon, Ghana and Nigeria.

The length of the forewings is 20.5-22.5 mm.

References

Moths described in 1965
Drepaninae
Moths of Africa